Elastic Reality was a warping and morphing software application available on Windows, Macintosh, and Silicon Graphics workstations and was discontinued in 1999.

Features
The workflow of the application is based around drawing source and destination curves or shapes onto an image using bézier curve tools.  The software then automatically generates an animated distortion of the image, commonly called a warp.  If the warp is used to blend two images together, the effect is called morphing.  Elastic Reality made its name with the ease of use of its tool, and the quality of the resulting warps.  Other warping tools have typically offered a simpler warping and morphing based on animating points on a grid, which can require significantly more work from the artist to animate distortion of organic shapes such as human faces.

The application also featured basic color correction and image compositing tools, as well as the ability to keyframe the motion of bézier shapes in groups and onto motion paths, and could be used for motion graphics effects not typically associated with morphing.  The application supported 8-bit and 16-bit images, and image sequences.

History

The product was originally created by ASDG of Madison, Wisconsin, which renamed itself Elastic Reality Inc, in 1994, following the success of its product. The company was acquired by Avid Technology in March 1995.  The product was rebranded Softimage Elastic Reality after Avid separately acquired Softimage in 1998.

Before 1994, ASDG had started on the Amiga, and produced an image processing application called Art Department Professional (ADPro), and in 1992 a precursor to Elastic Reality called MorphPlus.  Other software products included Image Independence (graphic file conversion and scaling), ASDG Abekas driver, Lightning F/X (for lightning effects (Later called Avid LFX)) and NSA (No Strings Attached) for removing wires from live action effects.

As early as 1994, Elastic Reality for SGI, (written by Paul Miller at ASDG in collaboration with Ted Fay at VisionArt) became the de facto morphing system in the film and broadcast industry, and contributed to hundreds of feature films and television effects, including The Iron Giant, Star Trek: Deep Space Nine, Independence Day, The Mask, and Batman Forever.

Along with Gryphon Software Morph, Elastic Reality continues to be used in the present day on old computers maintained for the purpose of running Elastic Reality.

In 1997, Avid made the core image warping engine available in the form of one morphing and one image warping effect in Avid Media Illusion 5.0.  These effects were integrated one year later in Avid|DS's image compositing module. The newest product to make these available is SoftimageXSI v6.0, released in December 2006, which features an integrated 2D image compositing module that is derived from Avid Media Illusion 6.0.

Compared to the classic Elastic Reality application, these effects use the 2D shape, user interface and other features native to these products, and the interaction is different, although the end results can be the same.  For example, in Avid Media Illusion and XSI 6.0, morphs can be performed with B-spline curves and polygonal lines, can process 16-bit images, and offer an interactive OpenGL preview of the warp.  The classic Elastic Reality application offered only Bezier curve, 8-bit image processing, and a wireframe preview which required a rendering step for accurate preview.  In Avid DS, the built-in 2D tracker can be used to procedurally animate the shapes.  In all three host  applications, the effects are offered as image operators inside an image compositing tree, and do not require launching a separate application which makes it easier to use in conjunction with other tools. On the other hand, the classic Elastic Reality application featured items like shape grouping which could be used for matting or complex intersection groups, a path tracing tool, and more seldom used motion graphics tools to constrain and animate shapes on a path and edit keyframes.  Avid DS features equivalent animation tools in its "Graphics" module, and standard tools in these host applications can be used to mask and combine image warping effects, often in ways more powerful than the classic Elastic Reality application offered.

Awards
Perry Kivolowitz and Garth Dickie received a 1996 Technical Achievement Award from the Academy of Motion Picture Arts and Sciences for the invention of shape-based warping and morphing embodied in Elastic Reality. This award recognizes that all shape-based warping and morphing systems descend from this innovation.

Development

Release history

See also
Avid Matador
Avid Media Illusion
Avid Technology
Perry Kivolowitz

External links
 Academy Award citation

References

MorphPlus
1993 software
Products and services discontinued in 1999
Amiga software
Animation software
Discontinued software
IRIX software
Classic Mac OS software
Proprietary software
Windows graphics-related software